Saltville is a ghost town in Salt Creek Township, Mitchell County, Kansas, United States.

History
Saltville was issued a post office in 1873. The post office was discontinued in 1901. The population in 1910 was 25.

References

Former populated places in Mitchell County, Kansas
Former populated places in Kansas